{{Infobox album
| name       = 15 Inolvidables| type       = Compilation
| artist     = Marco Antonio Solís
| cover      = 15 Inovidables cover.jpg
| alt        =
| released   = February 10, 2015
| recorded   = 1993 – 2008
| venue      =
| studio     =
| genre      = Latin
| length     =
| label      = Fonovisa
| producer   = Marco Antonio Solís
| prev_title = Antología
| prev_year  = 2014
| next_title = 15 Inolvidables Vol. 2
| next_year  = 2015
}}15 Inolvidables''' is a compilation album released by Marco Antonio Solís on February 10, 2015. Acepto Mi Derrota was recorded with Los Bukis.

"Inolvidable" is Spanish for "unforgettable".

Track listing

All songs were written and composed by Marco Antonio Solís

Charts

Weekly charts

Year-end charts

References

2015 compilation albums
Marco Antonio Solís compilation albums